Jawahar Navodaya Vidyalaya, Panchavati (JNVP) is a boarding school near Malgi, Uttara Kannada, India. JNVP is funded by the Indian Ministry of Education.

History

Principals
K G Saunshi   (24/10/1987 - 31/10/1988)
T K K Tathachare   (31/10/1988 - 04/08/1990)
R T Devaraddi   (04/06/1990 - 22/04/1992)
Btoseph Mundiyankal   (23/04/1992 - 15/06/1997)
M Shivananda Murthy (17/07/1997 - 22/04/2004)
N P Rajan   (26/06/2004 - 22/04/2015)
V B Lamani    (08/06/2015 - TIL)

References

External links

Jawahar Navodaya Vidyalayas in Karnataka
Educational institutions established in 1988
1988 establishments in Karnataka
Boarding schools in Karnataka
Schools in Uttara Kannada district